Richard Hope is a British actor who gained recognition from Brideshead Revisited as the doltish junior officer, Hooper, under Jeremy Irons charge. He is best known for playing Harris Pascoe in the UK TV drama Poldark. His theatre career includes in 1996, when he played Pierre Bezukhov in War and Peace at the Royal National Theatre having starred in another Tolstoy adaptation by Helen Edmundson, playing Levin in Anna Karenina. In 2015, he played Hector in The History Boys. In 2018–2019, he starred in the West End production The Woman in Black as Arthur Kipps.

Career
In 1978, Laurence Olivier gave him his first main professional TV part in Laurence Olivier Presents  Saturday, Sunday, Monday by Eduardo de Filippo. He worked with him again in 1981 when he appeared in the first and last episodes of Brideshead Revisited in which he played Lieutenant Hooper.

He played Ford Prefect  in the first stage production of Douglas Adams The Hitchhiker's Guide to the Galaxy with Ken Campbell’s The Science Fiction Theatre of Liverpool. He also appeared in their 22-hour epic The Warp and The Third Policeman. Campbell introduced him to Jérôme Savary and so Hope made his first West End appearance with his musical theater company Le Grand Magic Circus in 1001 Nights at the Shaftesbury Theatre in 1980.

He was Bertozzo in Accidental Death of an Anarchist (1979) UK Tour with Alfred Molina for The Belt and Braces Theatre Company directed by Gavin Richards ending at the  Half Moon Theatre in London. Richards played Molina's part when it transferred six months later to the Wyndham's Theatre West End.

In 1981, Peter Gill cast him in Don Juan and Much Ado About Nothing which started his long association with The National Theatre.
In 1984, he joined the Richard Eyre / David Hare Company playing Bill Smiley in the premiere of Pravda with Anthony Hopkins and then switching to the role of Eaton Sylvester in two extended revivals in the Olivier Theatre. This also included ensemble productions of The Government Inspector with Rik Mayall and Jim Broadbent  and Tim McInnerny’s Hamlet, in which he played Horatio. He met Simon McBurney at the National Theatre Studio, where Hope helped devise and develop The Visit and  Street of Crocodiles for  Theatre de Complicite. 1988 saw The Visit production as part of the 'Théâtre de Complicité at the Almeida' season, before the theatre closed for refurbishment; the production was revised in collaboration with The National Theatre in the Lyttleton stage in 1991. The production was invited to Spoleto Festival USA .

In 1987, he played Salto in Handmade Films thriller Bellman and True, written and directed by Richard Loncraine, and Hull City A.F.C. fan Malcolm in Mark Herman’s comedy See You At Wembley, Frankie Walsh which won the Student Academy Award. In Piece of Cake directed by Ian Toynton he was ‘Skull’ Skelton and he played Mortimer Tundish in both series of  Debbie Horsfield's comedy drama The Riff Raff Element, with Celia Imrie and Nicholas Farrell.

In 1996, he returned to the National Theatre as Pierre Bezukhov in the Shared Experience joint production of Leo Tolstoy's War and Peace, adapted by Helen Edmundson and directed by Nancy Meckler and Polly Teale. In 1998 he starred in another Tolstoy adaptation by Helen Edmundson, playing Levin in the Shared Experience production of Anna Karenina. Hope was associate director of this production which toured internationally, including runs at the Brooklyn Academy of Music and the Lyric Theatre. Clive Barnes of the New York Post described it as ‘One of the true highlights of a lifetime of theatre-going’.

In 2000, under coach Geoff Thompson (author of Real Punching), Hope learnt to wrestle for Jim Cartwright’s Hard Fruit at the Royal Court Theatre, directed by James Macdonald. During a performance of Hard Fruit, Hope broke his wrist when he hit a punch post that was missing its padding; he continued the run of the show  with an "authentic" bandaged hand.  With Mark Rylance he was one of the six actors in Mike Alfreds’ Cymbeline at Shakespeare's Globe Theatre in 2001. In 2002, the Royal National Theatre staged Simon Bent's adaptation of John Irving’s A Prayer for Owen Meany with Aidan McArdle as the title character and Hope as John Wheelwright.

Hope has been in several police dramas: Superintendent Harold Spence in  Agatha Christie's Poirot, Barry Purvis for two series of Murder Investigation Team (TV series) and semi-regular Rod Jesssop, the local headmaster, in The Bill.

Hope's first role in a musical was as Max Kellerman in Dirty Dancing at the  Aldwych Theatre in 2010, staying for eighteen months. He played Horst Ehmke in Paul Miller’s revival in Sheffield of Michael Frayn's play Democracy, which transferred to London's Old Vic Theatre in 2012. This was the third Frayn play he had performed in having toured the UK in Donkeys' Years and Noises Off.

Hope returned to the Almeida Theatre as Gabriel York in  Andrew Bovell’s When the Rain Stops Falling in 2009 and in 2012 as Albany in King Lear with Jonathan Pryce. In 2014, he played Queen Elizabeth I in the UK premiere of Sarah Ruhl's stage adaptation of Virginia Woolf's Orlando at the Royal Exchange with Suranne Jones and directed by Max Webster. In 2015, he played Hector in Kate Saxon’s production of Alan Bennett's The History Boys in Sell A Door Theatre Company UK Tour.
In 2015-16, he continued his long-standing collaboration with Helen Edmundson, playing Sidney Godolphin in the original Royal Shakespeare Company production of her original play Queen Anne, starring Natascha McElhone. In 2017 Queen Anne transferred to the Haymarket Theatre with Romola Garai.

He played recurring characters Malokeh and Bleytal (Silurians) in Doctor Who, and has recorded several related audios with Big Finish including Dr Who - Doom Coalition 3 'Absent Friends' which won the BBC Audio Drama Award 2017.

From May 2018 through March 2019 Richard played Arthur Kipps in The Woman in Black by Susan Hill adapted into a stage play by Stephen Mallatratt at the Fortune Theatre, London. Richard had already played Jerome in the 2004 BBC Radio 4 version directed by John Taylor as a Fiction Factory production.

In 2019, he returned as Harris Pascoe, Ross Poldark's banker and friend, for his fifth season of Poldark with screenplay by Debbie Horsfield: He previously worked with her on The Riff Raff Element.
He also appeared in an episode of Casualty.

Stage

Filmography

Film

Television

Audio work

References

External links 
 
 

English male stage actors
English male film actors
English male radio actors
English male television actors
Living people
National Youth Theatre members
People from Kettering
1953 births